Mohammed Al-Zubaidi (born 25 August 1997) is a Saudi professional footballer who currently plays as a full back for Al-Orobah.

Career
On 10 August 2022, Al-Zubaidi joined First Division side Al-Orobah on a free transfer.

References

External links
 

1997 births
Living people
Saudi Arabian footballers
Association football defenders
Association football fullbacks
Ettifaq FC players
Al-Ahli Saudi FC players
Al-Hazem F.C. players
Damac FC players
Al-Orobah FC players
Saudi Professional League players
Saudi First Division League players
Footballers at the 2018 Asian Games
Asian Games competitors for Saudi Arabia
21st-century Saudi Arabian people
20th-century Saudi Arabian people